Hocking is a suburb of Perth, Western Australia, located within the City of Wanneroo. Until 1994 it was part of the suburb of Wanneroo. The suburb was named after Herbert Hocking, a local landowner, first chairman of the Wanneroo Road Board and member of the Board from 1903 to 1931. He was also treasurer of the Agricultural Society in 1909.

The suburb is home to many new houses on Hinckley Parkway in the east of the suburb, much vacant land under development, as well as remnant market gardens. The primary new housing estate is Belvedere Hills.

Parks 
 Gungurru Park (Gungurru Dr)
 Chesterfield Park (Chesterfield Ave)
 Amery Park (Amery Rd)
 Bembridge Park (Manchester Dr)
 Hinckley Park (Hinckley Pkwy)

References

External links
 Belvedere Hills Website

Suburbs of Perth, Western Australia
Suburbs of the City of Wanneroo